Britanny Fousheé (born August 1, 1992), known professionally as Fousheé, is a singer-songwriter and guitarist from New Jersey. She came to wide notice when the vocals for her song "Deep End" were used on a hit song by rapper Sleepy Hallow in 2020. She released her RCA Records second extended play Time Machine in June 2021, and has collaborated with Vince Staples, Lil Wayne, James Blake, Steve Lacy and Lil Yachty. She released her debut album, Softcore, on November 17, 2022.

Background and early life

Fousheé was born and raised in New Jersey. Her Jamaican mother was a drummer for PEP, an all-woman 1980s Jamaican reggae band. Fousheé wrote her first song when she was five. In her younger years she studied voice, media, classical music, background arranging, guitar, and piano and performed with groups she had formed with her childhood friends. She attended Bridgewater-Raritan High School and continued her musical activities into college. She released her debut EP Speak Up in May 2018. In 2019 she moved to Los Angeles.

Career

2020: "Deep End" 
Fousheé was invited to contribute vocal samples to Splice, a royalty-free music database. Sleepy Hallow found her "Deep End" track and used it in his 2020 single "Deep End Freestyle." His track ended up going viral on TikTok and had an associated dance challenge which drove up its popularity; Fousheé hadn't known about the trend and wasn't credited on the song for some time. The Sleepy Hallow track, "Deep End (Freestyle)", was certified platinum by the RIAA in August 2020.

In the same year, Fousheé released her own version of the song, simply titled "deep end". The song reached the No. 10 spot on Billboard's March 27 Alternative Airplay chart. With that feat, she became the first Black woman to hit the Top 10 for that chart since Tracy Chapman with her song "Crossroads" in 1989. As of September 2022, "deep end" has amassed more than 234 million streams on Spotify.

2020–present: Solo career and collaborations 
Fousheé signed to RCA Records in June 2020. She also had the video for her track "By One" premiered by Essence in October of the same year.

She was named Billboard's R&B/hip-hop rookie for the month of March 2021. Her RCA debut EP, time machine, was released on June 4, 2021, by Trackmasters Entertainment/RCA Records. She was also named Apple's Up Next Artist for that same month and was the cover feature of Wonderland Magazine's Summer 2021 issue.

It was around the same time that she started collaborating with mainstream artists including Lil Wayne and Vince Staples. In August, she performed the song "Take Me Home" on The Tonight Show Starring Jimmy Fallon with the latter. In the fall, she toured with James Blake at venues including the Chicago Theatre and Radio City Music Hall. The track "Clap for Him" from time machine also featured Lil Yachty; he appeared in the track's music video as well.

In 2022, she collaborated with Steve Lacy and not only co-wrote but contributed background vocals for the songs "Sunshine" and "Bad Habit," both of which were lead singles for his second studio album Gemini Rights. "Bad Habit" made it to the number one spot on the Billboard Hot 100, becoming both of the artists' first number one entry on the chart. She also appeared on Ravyn Lenae's debut album Hypnos the same year. In the leadup to her debut album, she appeared in a feature article by Flaunt in which she was pictured in Prada, Loewe, Louis Vuitton, and Dolce & Gabbana. Her debut album Softcore was released on November 17, 2022.

Discography

Studio albums

Extended plays

Singles

References 

1996 births
Living people
Bridgewater-Raritan High School alumni
21st-century American singers
21st-century American women singers
Musicians from New Jersey